The rivière aux Frênes is a tributary of the east bank of the Henri River whose current flows successively into the rivière du Chêne and on the south shore of the St. Lawrence River.

The rivière aux Frênes flows in the municipalities of Saint-Janvier-de-Joly and Val-Alain, in the Lotbinière Regional County Municipality, in the administrative region of Chaudière-Appalaches, in Quebec, in Canada.

Geography 

The main neighboring watersheds of the Rivière aux Frênes are:
 North side: Rivière aux Cèdres, Huron River, rivière aux Ormes, St. Lawrence River;
 east side: rivière aux Cèdres, Jean-Houde River, Henri River, Noire River, Beaurivage River, rivière aux Pins;
 south side: Henri River, rivière du Chêne;
 west side: Henri River, rivière du Chêne.

The Rivière aux Frênes flows onto the east bank of the Henri River in the municipality of Val-Alain. This confluence is located upstream from the confluence of the rivière aux Cèdres and upstream from the confluence of the Henri River.

Toponymy 
The French term "Frêne" ("Ash" in English) turns out to be a species of leafy tree, comprising nine varieties.

The toponym “rivière aux Frênes” was made official on August 8, 1977, at the Commission de toponymie du Québec.

See also 

 List of rivers of Quebec

References 

 

Rivers of Chaudière-Appalaches
Lotbinière Regional County Municipality